Collingwood Area School is an area school in Golden Bay, New Zealand. It was established in 1859 as Collingwood School. In 1936 it expanded to include a class for secondary students and the following year it became a District High School. In 1978 it became an area school.

References

Secondary schools in New Zealand
Schools in the Tasman District